Spencer Parrish (born December 2, 1997) is an American composer, pianist and music director. Parrish garnered public attention through frequent regional performances as well as his music writing and production abilities.

Life and career

1997-2009: Early life and musical beginnings
Spencer Parrish was born in Rome, New York, the second son of Cornell & Lori Parrish and third child overall. It was in Mount Calvary Baptist Church where Parrish’s family first discovered his musical potential. During a choir rehearsal one night (in which his mother was directing), Parrish demonstrated his ability to play by ear for the first time at the age of six by walking over to a nearby piano and playing one of the songs the choir was singing. "I thought everyone could play songs as they heard it, I didn't realize it was a gift," Parrish says. Parrish studied classical piano for twelve years, starting at age six. He would later become the official music director and Hammond organist for the church at age nine.

2010-12: Relate
Spencer Parrish's first studio album, Relate, was released on July 29, 2012 under Island Def Jam Digital Distribution.

The first single, "Persistence", became available for digital download on February 18, 2012.  The album's lead single, "We Can Relate", became available for digital download on May 31, 2012.

Production for the album took place at Parrish’s home over the course of a year; then-14-year-old Parrish is attributed with producing and writing the entire album, focused mainly on his social life.

2012-present: High School and College
Parrish attended local high school Rome Free Academy for four years, graduating in 2016 as the salutatorian of his class. He went on in the fall of 2016 to attend Berklee College of Music in Boston, where he currently studies Jazz and Music education. He currently teaches High School band in Massachusetts.

Discography
 "Relate" (2012)
 TBA (2018)
 "LATE NIGHT WITH TOOTHPASTE" (2023)

References

Living people
1997 births
Record producers from New York (state)
People from Rome, New York
Musicians from New York (state)